The Cook County, Illinois, general election was held on November 2, 2010.

Primaries were held February 2, 2010.

Elections were held for Assessor, Clerk, Sheriff, Treasurer, President of the Cook County Board of Commissioners, all 17 seats of the Cook County Board of Commissioners, Cook County Board of Review district 1, three seats on the Water Reclamation District Board, and judgeships on the Circuit Court of Cook County.

Election information
2010 was a midterm election year in the United States. The primaries and general elections for Cook County races coincided with those for federal (House and Senate) and those for state elections.

Voter turnout
Voter turnout in Cook County during the primaries was 26.41%, with 761,626 ballots cast. The city of Chicago saw 27.282% turnout and suburban Cook County saw 25.54% turnout.

The general election saw 52.68% turnout, with 1,424,959 ballots cast. The city of Chicago saw 52.88% turnout and suburban Cook County saw 52.48% turnout.

Assessor 

In the 2010 Cook County Assessor election, incumbent Assessor James Houlihan, a Democrat,  first appointed in 1997 who was thrice reelected, did not seek reelection to what would have been a fourth full term. Joseph Berrios was elected to succeed him.

Primaries

Democratic
Candidates
Joseph Berrios, member of the Cook County Board of Review
Raymond A. Figueroa, former judge of the Cook County Circuit Court and former Chicago alderman
Robert Shaw, former member of the Cook County Board of Review and former Chicago alderman

Additionally, Andrea Raila had been a candidate before withdrawing from the race.

Endorsements

Results

Republican
Evanston Township assessor Sharon Strobeck-Eckersall won the Republican primary.

Green

General election

Clerk 

In the 2010 Cook County Clerk election, incumbent fifth-term Clerk David Orr, a Democrat, was reelected.

Primaries

Democratic

Republican

Green
No candidates, ballot-certified or formal write-in, ran in the Green primary.

General election

Sheriff 

In the 2010 Cook County Sheriff election, incumbent first-term Sheriff Tom Dart, a Democrat, was reelected.

Primaries

Democratic

Republican

Green

General election

Treasurer 

In the 2010 Cook County Treasurer election, incumbent third-term Treasurer Maria Pappas, a Democrat, was reelected.

Primaries

Democratic

Republican

Green
No candidates, ballot-certified or formal write-in, ran in the Green primary.

General election

President of the Cook County Board of Commissioners 

In the 2010 President of the Cook County Board of Commissioners election, incumbent President Todd Stroger, a Democrat appointed in 2006 and elected outright to a full term later that year, lost reelection, being unseated in the Democratic primary by Toni Preckwinkle, who went on to win the general election.

Her victory in this election would make Preckwinkle the first woman to be popularly elected to the office of president of the Cook County Board of Commissioners, and the second woman overall to hold the position after Bobbie L. Steele.

Primaries

Democratic
Candidates
Dorothy A. Brown, Clerk of the Cook County Circuit Court
Terrence J. O'Brien, Metropolitan Water Reclamation District of Greater Chicago President
Toni Preckwinkle, Chicago alderman
Todd Stroger, incumbent President of the Cook County Board of Commissioners

Polls

Results

Republican
Candidates
John Garrido III, Chicago Police Department officer
Roger A. Keats, former Illinois State Senator and former Illinois State Representative

Results

Green
Candidates
Thomas Tresser, activist

Results

General election

Cook County Board of Commissioners 

The 2010 Cook County Board of Commissioners election saw all seventeen seats of the Cook County Board of Commissioners up for election to four-year terms.

1st district

Incumbent third-term Commissioner Earlean Collins, a Democrat, was reelected.

Primaries

Democratic

Republican
No candidates, ballot-certified or formal write-in, ran in the Republican primary.

Green

General election

2nd district

Incumbent first-term commissioner Robert Steele, a Democrat, was reelected.

Primaries

Democratic

Republican
No candidates, ballot-certified or formal write-in, ran in the Republican primary.

Green

General election

3rd district

Incumbent Commissioner Jerry Butler, a Democrat who first assumed the office in 1985, was reelected.

Primaries

Democratic

Republican
No candidates, ballot-certified or formal write-in, ran in the Republican primary.

Green
No candidates, ballot-certified or formal write-in, ran in the Green primary. The Green Party ultimately nominated Marie J. "Jenny" Wohadlo.

General election

4th district

Incumbent first-term Commissioner William Beavers, a Democrat, was reelected.

Primaries

Democratic

Republican
No candidates, ballot-certified or formal write-in, ran in the Republican primary.

Green

General election

5th district

Incumbent fourth-term Commissioner Deborah Sims, a Democrat, was reelected.

Primaries

Democratic

Republican

Green
No candidates, ballot-certified or formal write-in, ran in the Green primary.

General election

6th district

Incumbent second-term Commissioner Joan Patricia Murphy, a Democrat, was reelected.

Primaries

Democratic

Republican
Sandra Czyznikiewicz defeated former 6th district Commissioner William Moran and Michael Hawkins in the Republican primary.

Green
No candidates, ballot-certified or formal write-in, ran in the Green primary.

General election

7th district

Incumbent fifth-term Commissioner Joseph Mario Moreno, a Democrat, lost reelection, being unseated in the Democratic primary by Jesús "Chuy" García, who went on to win the general election.

Primaries

Democratic

Republican
No candidates, ballot-certified or formal write-in, ran in the Republican primary.

Green

General election

8th district

Incumbent Commissioner Edwin Reyes, a Democrat, who been appointed in 2009 after Roberto Maldonado resigned to serve a Chicago alderman, was elected to a full term.

Primaries

Democratic

Republican
No candidates, ballot-certified or formal write-in, ran in the Republican primary.

Green
No candidates, ballot-certified or formal write-in, ran in the Green primary.

General election

9th district

Incumbent fourth-term Commissioner Peter N. Silvestri, a Republican, was reelected.

Primaries

Democratic

Republican

Green

General election

10th district

Incumbent Commissioner Bridget Gainer, a Democrat first appointed in 2009 (to fill the vacancy left after Mike Quigley resigned to assume office as the United States congressman), was elected to a full term.

Primaries

Democratic

Republican
No candidates, ballot-certified or formal write-in, ran in the Republican primary. The Republican Party ultimately nominated Wes Fowler.

Green
No candidates, ballot-certified or formal write-in, ran in the Republican primary.

General election

11th district

Incumbent Commissioner John P. Daley, a Democrat in office since 1992, was reelected.

Primaries

Democratic

Republican

Green
No candidates, ballot-certified or formal write-in, ran in the Republican primary.

General election

12th district

Incumbent second-term Commissioner Forrest Claypool, a Democrat, did not seek reelection. John Fritchey was elected to succeed him.

Primaries

Democratic

Republican
No candidates, ballot-certified or formal write-in, ran in the Republican primary. The Republican Party ultimately nominated William C. "Bill" Miceli.

Green
No candidates, ballot-certified or formal write-in, ran in the Green primary.

General election

13th district

Incumbent second-term Commissioner Larry Suffredin, a Democrat, was reelected.

Primaries

Democratic

Republican

Green

General election

14th district

Incumbent third-term Commissioner Gregg Goslin, a Republican, was reelected.

Primaries

Democratic

Republican

Green
No candidates, ballot-certified or formal write-in, ran in the Green primary.

General election

15th district

Incumbent first-term Commissioner Tim Schneider, a Republican, was reelected.

Primaries

Democratic

Republican

Green
No candidates, ballot-certified or formal write-in, ran in the Green primary. The Green Party ultimately nominated Laura Ehorn.

General election

16th district

Incumbent second-term Commissioner Tony Peraica, a Republican, lost reelection to Democrat Jeff Tobolski.

Primaries

Democratic

Republican

Green

General election

17th district

Incumbent second-term Commissioner Elizabeth Ann Doody Gorman, a Republican, was reelected.

Primaries

Democratic

Republican

Green

General election

Cook County Board of Review

In the 2010 Cook County Board of Review election, one seat, Democratic-held, out of its three seats was up for election.

The Cook County Board of Review has its three seats rotate the length of terms. In a staggered fashion (in which no two seats have coinciding two-year terms), the seats rotate between two consecutive four-year terms and a two-year term.

1st district

Incumbent first-term member Brendan Houlihan, a Democrat who had been elected in 2006, lost reelection to Republican Dan Patlak. This election was to a two-year term.

Primaries

Democratic

Republican

Green
No candidates, ballot-certified or formal write-in, ran in the Green primary.

General election

Water Reclamation District Board 

In the 2010 Metropolitan Water Reclamation District of Greater Chicago  election, three of the nine seats on the Metropolitan Water Reclamation District of Greater Chicago board were up for election in an at-large race. Since three six-year seats were up for election, voters could vote for up to three candidates and the top-three finishers would win.

Two of the incumbents for the three seats were seeking reelection, Democrats Barbara McGowan and Mariyana T. Spyropoulos. Each won reelection, joined by fellow Democrat Michael A. Alvarez in winning election.

Primaries

Democratic

Republican

Green

General election

Judicial elections 
8 judgeships on the Circuit Court of Cook County were up for partisan elections due to vacancies. Other judgeships had retention elections.

13 subcircuit courts judgeships were also up for partisan elections due to vacancies. Other judgeships had retention elections.

Other elections
Coinciding with the primaries, elections were held to elect the Democratic, Republican, and Green committeemen for the suburban townships.

See also 
 2010 Illinois elections

References 

Cook County
Cook County, Illinois elections
Cook County 2010
Cook County